The 2019 Meralco Bolts season was the 9th season of the franchise in the Philippine Basketball Association (PBA).

Draft picks

Roster

Philippine Cup

Eliminations

Standings

Game log

|-bgcolor=ffcccc
| 1
| January 16
| Phoenix
| L 92–93 (OT)
| Nico Salva (22)
| Cliff Hodge (9)
| Cliff Hodge (5)
| Smart Araneta Coliseum
| 0–1
|-bgcolor=ccffcc
| 2
| January 19
| Blackwater
| W 99–94
| Trevis Jackson (19)
| Cliff Hodge (10)
| Chris Newsome (7)
| Ynares Center
| 1–1
|-bgcolor=ffcccc
| 3
| January 25
| San Miguel
| L 93–105
| John Pinto (13)
| Cliff Hodge (9)
| John Pinto (5)
| Ynares Center
| 1–2
|-bgcolor=ccffcc
| 4
| January 30
| TNT
| W 88–77
| Chris Newsome (20)
| Cliff Hodge (13)
| Dillinger, Newsome (5)
| Cuneta Astrodome
| 2–2

|-bgcolor=ffcccc
| 5
| February 2
| NLEX
| L 83–87
| Jared Dillinger (16)
| Cliff Hodge (17)
| Hodge, Newsome (4)
| Ynares Center
| 2–3
|-bgcolor=ffcccc
| 6
| February 27
| Columbian
| L 85–86
| Chris Newsome (17)
| Hodge, Salva (9)
| Amer, Hodge (6)
| Smart Araneta Coliseum
| 2–4

|-bgcolor=ffcccc
| 7
| March 2
| Magnolia
| L 86–92
| Chris Newsome (22)
| Ranidel de Ocampo (8)
| Chris Newsome (7)
| Xavier University Gym
| 2–5
|-bgcolor=ccffcc
| 8
| March 8
| NorthPort
| W 126–123 (2OT)
| Chris Newsome (28)
| Chris Newsome (12)
| Ranidel de Ocampo (8)
| Smart Araneta Coliseum
| 3–5
|-bgcolor=ffcccc
| 9
| March 15
| Rain or Shine
| L 85–88
| Nico Salva (18)
| Chris Newsome (11)
| Chris Newsome (6)
| Cuneta Astrodome
| 3–6
|-bgcolor=ffcccc
| 10
| March 20
| Alaska
| L 77–92
| Nico Salva (23)
| Chris Newsome (9)
| Canaleta, Hodge (4)
| Smart Araneta Coliseum
| 3–7
|-bgcolor=ffcccc
| 11
| March 27
| Barangay Ginebra
| L 76–86
| Trevis Jackson (18)
| Ranidel de Ocampo (11)
| Jackson, Newsome (4)
| Smart Araneta Coliseum
| 3–8

Commissioner's Cup

Eliminations

Standings

Game log

|-bgcolor=ffcccc
| 1
| May 19
| Blackwater
| L 91–94 (OT)
| Gani Lawal (34)
| Gani Lawal (21)
| Ranidel de Ocampo (5)
| Mall of Asia Arena
| 0–1
|-bgcolor=ccffcc
| 2
| May 24
| Columbian
| W 101–92
| Gani Lawal (25)
| Gani Lawal (27)
| Jackson, Newsome (4)
| Smart Araneta Coliseum
| 1–1
|-bgcolor=ffcccc
| 3
| May 26
| Barangay Ginebra
| L 95–110
| Gani Lawal (38)
| Gani Lawal (20)
| Amer, Hugnatan (5)
| Smart Araneta Coliseum
| 1–2
|-bgcolor=ccffcc
| 4
| May 31
| Rain or Shine
| W 91–84
| Gani Lawal (19)
| Gani Lawal (12)
| Anjo Caram (6)
| Mall of Asia Arena
| 2–2

|-bgcolor=ccffcc
| 5
| June 7
| Phoenix
| W 101–95
| Gani Lawal (28)
| Gani Lawal (26)
| Chris Newsome (6)
| Smart Araneta Coliseum
| 3–2
|-bgcolor=ffcccc
| 6
| June 9
| Alaska
| L 89–93
| Gani Lawal (27)
| Gani Lawal (26)
| Baser Amer (4)
| Ynares Center
| 3–3
|-bgcolor=ffcccc
| 7
| June 9
| TNT
| L 91–104
| Chris Newsome (32)
| Jimmie Taylor (18)
| Chris Newsome (5)
| Smart Araneta Coliseum
| 3–4
|-bgcolor=ffcccc
| 8
| June 19
| NLEX
| L 91–100
| Gani Lawal (15)
| Gani Lawal (14)
| Baser Amer (4)
| Mall of Asia Arena
| 3–5
|-bgcolor=ffcccc
| 9
| June 29
| Magnolia
| L 88–99
| Delroy James (35)
| Delroy James (10)
| James, Tolomia (4)
| Mayor Vitaliano D. Agan Coliseum
| 3–6

|-bgcolor=ffcccc
| 10
| June 12
| NorthPort
| L 92–93
| Chris Newsome (21)
| Cliff Hodge (12)
| Delroy James (10)
| Cuneta Astrodome
| 3–7
|-bgcolor=ccffcc
| 11
| June 17
| San Miguel
| W 95–91
| Delroy James (34)
| Almazan, Hodge, Quinto (7)
| Delroy James (6)
| Smart Araneta Coliseum
| 4–7

Playoffs

Bracket

Governors' Cup

Eliminations

Standings

Bracket

Transactions

Trades

Preseason

References

Meralco Bolts seasons
Meralco Bolts